Shining South is a supplement to the 3.5 edition of the Dungeons & Dragons role-playing game.

Contents
Shining South is an accessory for the Forgotten Realms that details the distant lands beyond the Lake of Steam and the Firesteap Mountains: Halruaa, Shaar, Luiren, and Dambrath.

Publication history
Shining South was written by Thomas M. Reid, and published in October 2004. Cover art was by Sam Wood, with interior art by Wayne England, Sam Wood, Richard Sardinha, Carl Frank, Chris Hawkes, Jason Engle, Christopher Rush, Ralph Horsley, Vince Locke, and Mike Dubisch.

Reception

References

Forgotten Realms sourcebooks
Role-playing game supplements introduced in 2004